The International Institute for Counter-Terrorism (ICT) is a conservative Israeli think tank founded in 1996 and located at Reichman University, in Herzliya, Israel.

Activities
According to Foreign Affairs, ICT presents a conservative Israeli perspective known for its searchable database on terrorist attacks by organizations both within and outside the Middle East.

In the University of Pennsylvania's 2014 Global Go To Think Tanks Report, ICT was ranked as the 29th best think tank in the Middle East and North Africa.

The ICT's reporting has been mentioned by The Village Voice, USA Today, and Asian Tribune.

Leadership
One of ICT's founders and board members, Boaz Ganor, served as the ICT's executive director from 1996 through 2004, when he was temporarily replaced by Lior Lotan. Ganor returned as executive director in late 2006. Eitan Azani serves as deputy director.

Funding
The ICT professes to rely exclusively on private donations and revenue from events, projects and programs.

References

External links
Homepage

Foreign policy and strategy think tanks
Think tanks based in Israel
Think tanks established in 1996
Centers for the study of antisemitism
Herzliya